Streamstown is a village in County Westmeath, Ireland. It sits roughly 20 km from the county town of Mullingar. Streamstown was historically called Ballintruhan, which is an anglicisation of its Irish name.

A horse named Streamstown competed in the 2002 Grand National Steeplechase, finishing in ninth place.

Streamstown railway station opened on 1 August 1851 and finally closed on 17 June 1963. Midland Great Western Railway from Athlone to Mullingar formed part of the main route between Dublin, County Galway and County Mayo until 1987, when Córas Iompair Éireann (CIÉ) closed the line and severing the rail link between Athlone and Mullingar. This section of rail line has since been developed into the Athlone to Mullingar Cycleway, which opened in October 2015. 

Streamstown has a fox hunting club called the Streamstown Harriers, affiliated with the Irish Masters of Harriers Association.

See also
 List of towns and villages in Ireland

References

Towns and villages in County Westmeath